America Records was a French jazz record label.

Discography

External links
Discogs

 
French record labels
Jazz record labels